Whot is a card game played with non-standard deck in five suits: circles, crosses, triangles, stars and squares. It is a shedding game similar to Crazy Eights. At one point, the game was manufactured by John Waddington Ltd.

Early packs were printed with the slogans "a unique card game" and "a game for everyone".  The name of the game is given an exclamation mark ("Whot!") on later packs.

The card has been adapted into different formats, the most popular of which in Africa is the Nigerian Whot Game, where it has been described at Nigeria's national card game.

Gameplay
A standard Whot! deck contains 54 cards which are grouped into different shapes: circles, squares, triangles, stars and crosses. Of the 54 cards, four or five are special cards designated the number 20 and are sometimes called "Whot!" cards. To start, a dealer (usually one of the players) shuffles the deck and shares out equal number of cards to each player. They then draw a random card from the deck to serve as the starting card (a base on which other cards would be played). What remains of the deck is set aside (generally referred to as "market" in most parts of Nigeria). 

The first player (who is one other than the dealer) plays a card that corresponds to the base in either shape or number, if they do not have such a card, they visit the deck and draw one. The game continues until a player plays all their cards, that is, they "check up". After this, the remaining players can decide whether to keep playing or end the game.

Special Cards
In the game of Whot!, certain card numbers have special features, these are:

1, Hold On every player other than the one who played the card loses a turn and the card player plays again
2, Pick Two the next player draws two cards from the deck as well as loses their turn
8, Suspension when played, the next player loses their turn
14, General Market every other player draws a card from the deck and loses a turn
20, WHOT! the one who plays the card can ask for any shape regardless of the card played before it. In most parts of Nigeria, the card player begins with, "I need..." after which some players (usually the one next in turn) or all the players ask, "What?" then they reply with their desired shape

Some variants of the game have the card number 5 to represent "Pick Three" in which the succeeding player must draw three cards from the deck and lose their turn, Or in some case, players use 7 as the special card for "Pick Two" and 4 as the special card for "General Market", instead of 2 and 14 respectively

References

External links
Rules of Card Games - Whot!

Card games introduced in 1935
Dedicated deck card games
Eights group